Vacerrena is a small genus of sea snails in the family Fissurellidae, the keyhole limpets and slit limpets.

Species
Species within the genus Vacerrena include:
 Vacerrena kesteveni (Hedley, 1900)
 Vacerrena nana (H. Adams, 1872)

References

 Iredale, T. (1958). Some molluscan name changes. Proceedings of the Royal Zoological Society of New South Wales. 1956-57: 103-104.

External links
 Iredale, T. (1924). Results from Roy Bell's molluscan collections. Proceedings of the Linnean Society of New South Wales. 49(3): 179-278.

Fissurellidae
Gastropod genera
Taxa named by Tom Iredale
Taxa described in 1958